Alf Wellington (1913−1993) nicknamed "Duke" was an Australian rugby league footballer who played in the 1930s and 1940s.  Wellington played for Canterbury-Bankstown and Newtown.  Wellington was a foundation player for Canterbury-Bankstown.

Playing career
Wellington played for the club in their first ever game against North Sydney at North Sydney Oval which finished in a 20–5 loss on April 25 1935.  The match was also Wellington's first grade debut.  Wellington went on to play 1 further game for Canterbury which was a 37–9 loss against South Sydney at Marrickville Oval. 

Canterbury-Bankstown finished the 1935 season in second last position narrowly avoiding the wooden spoon which was handed to University.

In 1938, Wellington joined Newtown and played 12 games for the club over 3 seasons before retiring.

References

Newtown Jets players
Canterbury-Bankstown Bulldogs players
Rugby league players from Sydney
Rugby league props
Rugby league second-rows
1913 births
Place of birth missing
1993 deaths
Place of death missing